Ulysses Jones Jr. (June 7, 1951, Memphis, Tennessee – November 9, 2010) was an American politician and a Democratic member of the Tennessee House of Representatives for the 98th district, which encompasses a part of Shelby County, Tennessee.

In the state House of Representatives, Ulysses Jones was the chair of the House State and Local Government Committee and the cochair of the Joint Lottery Oversight Committee. He was a member of numerous House committees: the Calendar and Rules Committee, the Education Committee, the K-12 Subcommittee, the Elections Subcommittee, the State Government Subcommittee, the Local Government Subcommittee, the Joint Lottery Scholarship Committee, the Joint Tennessee Education Lottery Corporation Committee, the Joint Select Oversight Committee on Education, and the Tennessee Commemorative Women's Suffrage Commission.

Ulysses Jones graduated from North Side High School. He attended the University of Memphis and Tennessee State University. He worked as a battalion chief for Memphis Fire Services.

It has been alleged by Tim Willis, informant for Operation Tennessee Waltz, that Ulysses Jones took a bribe from E-Cycle, a fictitious company that had been set up by the FBI. Jones said in response that it had only been a campaign contribution, and that he would "be willing to take a lie detector test, even by the FBI."

When Elvis Presley died on August 16, 1977, Ulysses Jones and Charles Crossby were the two paramedics on the scene at Graceland when it was reported to Memphis Fire Department's Engine House No. 29 that a person was having trouble breathing. Jones was also interviewed by Albert Goldman for his book "Elvis", he also appeared on several TV shows talking about that day.

References

External links
"Tennessee House Member." Legislative Information Services. Accessed January 7, 2007.

1951 births
African-American state legislators in Tennessee
Democratic Party members of the Tennessee House of Representatives
University of Memphis alumni
Tennessee State University alumni
2010 deaths
20th-century African-American people
21st-century African-American people